Rony Hossain (born 4 April 1990) is a Bangladeshi cricketer. He made his Twenty20 debut for Brothers Union in the 2018–19 Dhaka Premier Division Twenty20 Cricket League on 25 February 2019.

References

External links
 

1990 births
Living people
Bangladeshi cricketers
Brothers Union cricketers
Cricketers from Dhaka